Gilbert Plains is a former provincial electoral division in Manitoba, Canada.

It was created by redistribution for the 1903 provincial election, and eliminated with the 1958 election.

Provincial representatives

Former provincial electoral districts of Manitoba